Johannes Martinus ("Jan") Siemerink (born 14 April 1970) is a retired tennis player from the Netherlands. The former Dutch Davis Cup captain reached a career-high ATP ranking of 14.

Career

Tennis
As a junior player, Siemerink was the Dutch 18-under champion in 1988. He also won the doubles title at the 1988 Orange Bowl junior championship in Florida.

Siemerink turned professional in 1989. Over the course of his career, he won four top-level singles titles (at Singapore in 1991, Nottingham in 1996, and at Rotterdam and Toulouse in 1998). He also won ten tour doubles titles, the most significant of which were the Miami Masters in 1993 and the Monte Carlo Masters in 1996.

Siemerink's best performance at a Grand Slam event came at Wimbledon in 1998, where he reached the quarterfinals by defeating Ctislav Doseděl, David Prinosil, Jonas Björkman and Magnus Larsson before being knocked-out by Goran Ivanišević. Siemerink is also known for winning a fourth set tiebreak against compatriot Richard Krajicek from 6–0 down in the 1994 US Open, though Krajicek eventually won the match.

Siemerink played for the Netherlands in the Davis Cup between 1991 and 2001, compiling a 17–10 record. He helped the Netherlands reach the World Group semifinals in 2001.

Siemerink's career-high rankings were world No. 14 in singles (in 1998) and world No. 16 in doubles (in 1996). His career prize-money totaled $4,347,693.

After his playing career Siemerink was captain of the Dutch Davis Cup team from 2006 until 2016.

Other
In February 2018, Siemerink became team manager of the Amsterdam professional football club AFC Ajax.

ATP career finals

Singles: 12 (4 titles, 8 runner-ups)

Doubles: 18 (10 titles, 7 runner-ups)

ATP Challenger and ITF Futures finals

Singles: 5 (3–2)

Doubles: 7 (6–1)

Performance timelines

Singles

Doubles

References

External links
 
 
 

1970 births
Living people
Dutch male tennis players
Olympic tennis players of the Netherlands
Sportspeople from Katwijk
Tennis players at the 1992 Summer Olympics
Tennis players at the 1996 Summer Olympics
Hopman Cup competitors
Tennis commentators
AFC Ajax non-playing staff